Love is the eleventh studio album by R&B group Boyz II Men. It was released by Decca Records on November 24, 2009 in the United States. Like their previous album, Love was produced by Randy Jackson and Boyz II Men. This is their third cover album, following Throwback, Vol. 1 and Motown: A Journey Through Hitsville USA, which were released in 2004 and 2007 respectively. The album is composed of popular love songs of the past.  It also features a collaboration with Michael Bublé. The demo version of "Back for Good" was originally recorded with Irish singer, Nadine Coyle.  The album sold 15,000 copies its first week.

Critical reception

AllMusic editor Andy Kellman gave the album two out of five stars. He found that "early-‘60s R&B, late-‘90s country, and early-‘80s rock are all part of the mix only hints at the randomness of the selections. Despite the range of the sources, Boyz II Men tie it all together, nearly to a fault. The group makes the occasional modification to the originals, like the ticking-clock vocal effect on Cyndi Lauper's "Time After Time"; otherwise, if you know the originals, and you know Boyz II Men, you can play these versions in your head without having heard them."

Track listing

Charts

Release history

References

2009 albums
Boyz II Men albums
Decca Records albums
Covers albums